Hari Mandir means House of God - the human form, where the True Lord resides.

It may refer to:

 Harmandir Sahib (Golden Temple), a significant Sikh gurdwara
 Dev Mandir, Hari Mandir according to Swaminarayan Hindu philosophy